Events in the year 1374 in Norway.

Incumbents
Monarch: Haakon VI Magnusson

Events

Arts and literature

Births

Deaths
1 December – Magnus IV of Sweden, King (born 1316).

References

Norway